Silberling is the colloquial name for the n-coaches of the Deutsche Bundesbahn, a type of regional passenger coach of which more than 5,000 units were built from 1958 to 1981. Nearly all of the coaches have undergone extensive modernisation – these modernised units are widely known as Mintling, Grünling ("greenling") or Rotling ("redling") after their exterior colours. The term Buntling ("colourfulling") is used to denote refurbished Silberling coaches in general.

Origin of the name
The term Silberling derives from the coaches' stainless steel body which gave them a unique look during their term of service. Translated it means "silverling" in the English language. Historically, Silberling is a silver coin and widely known from the bible: the thirty pieces of silver (in the German Bible: "30 Silberlinge", Matthew 26,14) Judas obtained for his treason.

Technical data

Type overview

 Indicator z: Central control (Zugsammelschiene)
 Indicator r: disc brakes

See also
Rail transport in Germany
History of rail transport in Germany

Railway coaches of Germany